Devil's Canyon, in present-day Kiowa County, Oklahoma, was the site of the first formal contact between the United States government and the Plains Indians. On July 21, 1834, US troops under the command of Col. Henry Dodge escorted government officials to a peace conference at the Wichita village on the prairie at the confluence of the canyon and the North Fork of the Red River.

References

Archaeological sites on the National Register of Historic Places in Oklahoma
Geography of Oklahoma
American frontier
Geography of Kiowa County, Oklahoma
National Register of Historic Places in Kiowa County, Oklahoma